Heerstraße is the German word for military road, a type or road that was built to enable the rapid movement of armies.

Specific roads built for this purpose include the:
 Aachen-Frankfurter Heerstraße
 Bernauer Heerstraße
 Lüneburger Heerstraße
 Heerstraße (Berlin)

Heerstraße is also used in:
 Berlin Heerstraße station, a railway station in Berlin
 Heerstraße (Frankfurt U-Bahn), a metro station on the Frankfurt U-Bahn
 British War Cemetery, Heerstraße, on the list of cemeteries in Berlin
 in Bremen since 1914 the name of former chaussees (for example, the Schwachhauser Heerstraße)
 a road in Frankfurt am Main, once part of the historic Elisabethenstraße

See also
 Roman road
 Military road

German words and phrases
Types of roads